The following species in the flowering plant genus Cousinia are recognised by Plants of the World Online. They are morphologically very similar to members of the burdock genus Arctium, but differ in their chromosome numbers.

Cousinia abbreviata 
Cousinia acanthoblephara 
Cousinia acanthodendron 
Cousinia acanthostephana 
Cousinia acrodroma 
Cousinia actinacantha 
Cousinia actinia 
Cousinia adenophora 
Cousinia adenostegia 
Cousinia adenosticta 
Cousinia adnata 
Cousinia affinis 
Cousinia afghanica 
Cousinia agelocephala 
Cousinia aggregata 
Cousinia agridaghensis 
Cousinia aintabensis 
Cousinia aitchisonii 
Cousinia alaica 
Cousinia alata 
Cousinia albertoregelia 
Cousinia albescens 
Cousinia albida 
Cousinia albiflora 
Cousinia alepideae 
Cousinia aleppica 
Cousinia alexeenkoana 
Cousinia alfredii 
Cousinia algurdina 
Cousinia aligudarzensis 
Cousinia allolepis 
Cousinia alpina 
Cousinia ambigens 
Cousinia amicorum 
Cousinia ammophila 
Cousinia amoena 
Cousinia andarabensis 
Cousinia × androssowii 
Cousinia angrenii 
Cousinia angusticeps 
Cousinia annua 
Cousinia anoplophylla
Cousinia antonowi 
Cousinia apiculata 
Cousinia aptera 
Cousinia arachnoidea 
Cousinia arakensis 
Cousinia araneosa 
Cousinia araneotexta 
Cousinia araxena 
Cousinia archibaldii 
Cousinia arctotidifolia 
Cousinia ardalensis 
Cousinia arenaria 
Cousinia argentea 
Cousinia ariana 
Cousinia arida 
Cousinia armena 
Cousinia aspera 
Cousinia assadii 
Cousinia assyriaca 
Cousinia astracanica 
Cousinia × atripurpurea 
Cousinia atrobracteata 
Cousinia atropatana 
Cousinia attariae 
Cousinia aucheri 
Cousinia auriculata 
Cousinia austrojordanica 
Cousinia autranii 
Cousinia azerbaidjanica 
Cousinia azmarensis 
Cousinia baberi 
Cousinia bachtiarica 
Cousinia badghysi 
Cousinia balchanica 
Cousinia baluchistanica 
Cousinia bamianica 
Cousinia baranovii 
Cousinia barbeyi 
Cousinia barezica 
Cousinia batalinii 
Cousinia bazoftensis 
Cousinia beauverdiana 
Cousinia beckeri 
Cousinia belangeri 
Cousinia bicolor 
Cousinia bienerti 
Cousinia bijarensis 
Cousinia bipinnata 
Cousinia birandiana 
Cousinia blepharobasis 
Cousinia bobekii 
Cousinia bobrovii 
Cousinia boissieri 
Cousinia bonvaleti 
Cousinia botschantzevii 
Cousinia boyerahmadica 
Cousinia brachyptera 
Cousinia brevicaulis 
Cousinia bucharica 
Cousinia bungeana 
Cousinia buphthalmoides 
Cousinia butkovii 
Cousinia caesarea 
Cousinia caespitosa 
Cousinia calcitrapa 
Cousinia calcitrapella 
Cousinia calocephala 
Cousinia calolepis 
Cousinia calva 
Cousinia campylaraphis 
Cousinia × cana 
Cousinia candicans 
Cousinia candolleana 
Cousinia canescens 
Cousinia carduncelloidea 
Cousinia caroli-henrici 
Cousinia carthamoides 
Cousinia cataonica 
Cousinia catenata 
Cousinia cavarae 
Cousinia centauroides 
Cousinia ceratophora 
Cousinia chaetocephala 
Cousinia chamaepeuce 
Cousinia chejrabadensis 
Cousinia chionophila 
Cousinia chitralensis 
Cousinia chlorocephala 
Cousinia chlorosphaera 
Cousinia chlorothyrsa 
Cousinia chrysacantha 
Cousinia chrysandra 
Cousinia chrysantha 
Cousinia chrysochlora 
Cousinia cirsioides 
Cousinia cisdarvasica 
Cousinia coerulea 
Cousinia commutata 
Cousinia concinna 
Cousinia concolor 
Cousinia congesta 
Cousinia consanguinea 
Cousinia contumax 
Cousinia cordifolia 
Cousinia coronata 
Cousinia corymbosa 
Cousinia crassipes 
Cousinia crispa 
Cousinia cryptadena 
Cousinia curvibracteata 
Cousinia cylindracea 
Cousinia cylindrocephala 
Cousinia cynaroides 
Cousinia czatkalica 
Cousinia czerniakowskae 
Cousinia dalahuensis 
Cousinia daralaghezica 
Cousinia darwasica 
Cousinia dasylepis 
Cousinia davisiana 
Cousinia dayi 
Cousinia decipiens 
Cousinia decolorans 
Cousinia decumbens 
Cousinia decurrens 
Cousinia decurrentifolia 
Cousinia deluensis 
Cousinia denaensis 
Cousinia deserti 
Cousinia dichotoma 
Cousinia dichromata 
Cousinia diezii 
Cousinia dimoana 
Cousinia dipterocarpa 
Cousinia discolor 
Cousinia dissecta 
Cousinia dissectifolia 
Cousinia divaricata 
Cousinia dolichoclada 
Cousinia dolicholepis 
Cousinia dshisakensis 
Cousinia dubia 
Cousinia eburnea 
Cousinia ecbatanensis 
Cousinia echinocephala 
Cousinia edmondsonii 
Cousinia egens 
Cousinia elburzensis 
Cousinia eleonorae 
Cousinia elephantina 
Cousinia elwendensis 
Cousinia elymaitica 
Cousinia erectispina 
Cousinia erinacea 
Cousinia eriobasis 
Cousinia eriophylla 
Cousinia eriorrhiza 
Cousinia eriotricha 
Cousinia erivanensis 
Cousinia ermenekensis 
Cousinia eryngioides 
Cousinia esfandiarii 
Cousinia euchlora 
Cousinia eugenii 
Cousinia euphratica 
Cousinia eurylepis 
Cousinia fabrorum 
Cousinia falcinella 
Cousinia falconeri 
Cousinia fallax 
Cousinia farimanensis 
Cousinia farsistanica 
Cousinia fascicularis 
Cousinia fedorovii 
Cousinia ferghanensis 
Cousinia ferruginea 
Cousinia fetissowi 
Cousinia finitima 
Cousinia firuzkuhensis
Cousinia foliosa 
Cousinia fragilis 
Cousinia fragillima 
Cousinia franchetii 
Cousinia fraternella 
Cousinia freitagii 
Cousinia freynii 
Cousinia fursei 
Cousinia gabrielae 
Cousinia gaharensis 
Cousinia gatchsaranica 
Cousinia gaubae 
Cousinia gedrosiaca 
Cousinia ghahremanii 
Cousinia ghorana 
Cousinia gigantolepis 
Cousinia gigantoptera 
Cousinia gilanica 
Cousinia gilliatii 
Cousinia glabriseta 
Cousinia glandulosa 
Cousinia glaphyra 
Cousinia glaphyrocephala 
Cousinia glaucopsis 
Cousinia glochidiata 
Cousinia gmelinii 
Cousinia gnezdilloi 
Cousinia gomolitzkii 
Cousinia gontscharowii 
Cousinia gracilis 
Cousinia graminifolia 
Cousinia grandis 
Cousinia grantii 
Cousinia greuteri 
Cousinia griffithiana 
Cousinia grigoriewii 
Cousinia grisea 
Cousinia gulczensis 
Cousinia gymnoclada 
Cousinia hablitzii 
Cousinia haeckeliae 
Cousinia hakkarica 
Cousinia halysensis 
Cousinia hamadae 
Cousinia hamadanensis 
Cousinia hamosa 
Cousinia harazensis 
Cousinia hastifolia 
Cousinia haussknechtii 
Cousinia hazarensis 
Cousinia hedgei 
Cousinia hemsleyana 
Cousinia hergtiana 
Cousinia hermonis 
Cousinia × heterogenetos 
Cousinia heteroloba 
Cousinia heterophylla 
Cousinia hilariae 
Cousinia hohenackeri 
Cousinia hololeuca 
Cousinia hoplites 
Cousinia hoplophylla 
Cousinia horrida 
Cousinia humilis 
Cousinia × hybrida 
Cousinia hymenostephanus 
Cousinia hypochionea 
Cousinia hypoleuca 
Cousinia hypopolia 
Cousinia hystricocephala 
Cousinia iconica 
Cousinia ilicifolia 
Cousinia iljinii 
Cousinia immitans 
Cousinia immitantiformis 
Cousinia incompta 
Cousinia inflata 
Cousinia infundibularis 
Cousinia insignis 
Cousinia integrifolia 
Cousinia intermedia 
Cousinia intertexta 
Cousinia iranshahriana 
Cousinia iranshahrii 
Cousinia irritans 
Cousinia isfahanica 
Cousinia × iskanderi 
Cousinia jacobsii 
Cousinia jassyensis 
Cousinia joharchii 
Cousinia juzepczukii 
Cousinia kadereitii 
Cousinia kaluensis 
Cousinia × kamarbandensis 
Cousinia karkasensis 
Cousinia kasachstanica 
Cousinia kataghanica 
Cousinia kazachorum 
Cousinia keredjensis 
Cousinia kermanensis 
Cousinia kermanshahensis 
Cousinia kerstanii 
Cousinia khashensis 
Cousinia khorasanica 
Cousinia khorramabadensis 
Cousinia kilouyensis 
Cousinia kirrindica 
Cousinia knorringiae 
Cousinia koelzii 
Cousinia kokanica 
Cousinia komaroffii 
Cousinia komidjanensis 
Cousinia kopi-karadaghensis 
Cousinia kornhuberi 
Cousinia korowiakowi 
Cousinia kotschyi 
Cousinia kovalevskiana 
Cousinia krauseana 
Cousinia kuekenthalii 
Cousinia kuramensis
Cousinia kurdistanica 
Cousinia × kurubasgecidiensis 
Cousinia lachnobasis 
Cousinia lachnopoda 
Cousinia lachnosphaera 
Cousinia lactiflora 
Cousinia laetevirens 
Cousinia lamakini 
Cousinia lanata 
Cousinia lancifolia 
Cousinia laniceps 
Cousinia lasiolepis 
Cousinia lasiophylla 
Cousinia leiocephala 
Cousinia lepida
Cousinia leptacma 
Cousinia leptocampyla 
Cousinia leptocephala 
Cousinia leptoclada 
Cousinia leptocladoides 
Cousinia leptolepis 
Cousinia leptomera 
Cousinia leucantha 
Cousinia libanotica 
Cousinia lignosissima 
Cousinia linczewskii 
Cousinia litwinowiana 
Cousinia longibracteata 
Cousinia longifolia 
Cousinia lordeganensis 
Cousinia lucida 
Cousinia lurestanica 
Cousinia lurorum 
Cousinia lyrata 
Cousinia maassoumii 
Cousinia macrocephala 
Cousinia macrolepis 
Cousinia macroptera 
Cousinia magnifica 
Cousinia malacophylla 
Cousinia malurensis 
Cousinia manucehrii 
Cousinia maracandica 
Cousinia margaritae 
Cousinia margiana 
Cousinia masulehensis 
Cousinia mattfeldii 
Cousinia megalomastix 
Cousinia meghrica 
Cousinia mehreganii 
Cousinia meshhedensis 
Cousinia × mesomorpha 
Cousinia microcarpa 
Cousinia millefontana 
Cousinia mindshelkensis 
Cousinia minkwitziae 
Cousinia miserabilis 
Cousinia moabitica 
Cousinia mobayenii 
Cousinia mogensii 
Cousinia mogoltavica 
Cousinia mollis 
Cousinia monocephala 
Cousinia mozaffarianii 
Cousinia mozdouranensis 
Cousinia mucida 
Cousinia mulgediifolia 
Cousinia multiloba 
Cousinia murgabica 
Cousinia mutehensis 
Cousinia myrioglochis 
Cousinia myriolepis 
Cousinia myriotoma 
Cousinia nabelekii 
Cousinia nana 
Cousinia neglecta 
Cousinia neubaueri 
Cousinia newesskyana 
Cousinia ninae 
Cousinia niveocoronata 
Cousinia noeana 
Cousinia novissima 
Cousinia nujianensis 
Cousinia odontolepis 
Cousinia olgae 
Cousinia oligocephala 
Cousinia olivieri 
Cousinia omissa 
Cousinia omphalodes 
Cousinia onopordioides 
Cousinia onopordon 
Cousinia oophora 
Cousinia oopoda 
Cousinia oreodoxa 
Cousinia oreoxerophila 
Cousinia orientalis 
Cousinia orthacantha 
Cousinia orthoclada 
Cousinia ortholepis 
Cousinia orthoneura 
Cousinia oshtorankuhensis 
Cousinia ottonis 
Cousinia outichaschensis 
Cousinia ovczinnikovii 
Cousinia oxiana 
Cousinia oxytoma 
Cousinia panjshirensis 
Cousinia pannosa 
Cousinia pannosiformis 
Cousinia papillosa 
Cousinia parjumanensis 
Cousinia parsana 
Cousinia parviceps 
Cousinia parviziana 
Cousinia pasargardensis 
Cousinia patentispina 
Cousinia pauciramosa 
Cousinia pectinata 
Cousinia peduncularis 
Cousinia pergamacea 
Cousinia perovskiensis 
Cousinia persarum 
Cousinia persica 
Cousinia perspolitana 
Cousinia pestalozzae 
Cousinia phyllocephala 
Cousinia pichleriana 
Cousinia pinarocephala 
Cousinia pineticola 
Cousinia piptocephala 
Cousinia platyacantha 
Cousinia platylepis 
Cousinia platyptera 
Cousinia platyraphis 
Cousinia platystegia 
Cousinia podlechii 
Cousinia podophylla 
Cousinia polycephala 
Cousinia polyneura 
Cousinia polytimetica 
Cousinia porphyrochrysea 
Cousinia porphyrostephana 
Cousinia postiana 
Cousinia praestans 
Cousinia prasina 
Cousinia princeps 
Cousinia prolifera 
Cousinia proxima 
Cousinia psammophila 
Cousinia pseudactinia 
Cousinia pseudaffinis 
Cousinia pseudobonvalotii 
Cousinia pseudocandolleana 
Cousinia pseudocirsium 
Cousinia pseudodshizakensis 
Cousinia pseudolanata 
Cousinia pseudomollis 
Cousinia pseudostenolepis 
Cousinia pterocarpa 
Cousinia pterocaulos 
Cousinia pugionifera 
Cousinia pulchella 
Cousinia pulcherantha 
Cousinia pulchra 
Cousinia pulvinaris 
Cousinia pungens 
Cousinia purpurea 
Cousinia pusilla 
Cousinia pycnocephala 
Cousinia pycnoloba 
Cousinia pygmaea 
Cousinia qaisarensis 
Cousinia qaradaghensis 
Cousinia qarehbilensis 
Cousinia quettensis 
Cousinia racemosa 
Cousinia raddeana 
Cousinia radians 
Cousinia ramosissima 
Cousinia ramulosa 
Cousinia raphiostegia 
Cousinia rava 
Cousinia rawanduzensis 
Cousinia rechingerae 
Cousinia rechingerorum 
Cousinia recurvata 
Cousinia regelii 
Cousinia renominata 
Cousinia resinosa 
Cousinia rhabdodes 
Cousinia rhaphiocephala 
Cousinia rhodantha 
Cousinia rhombiformis 
Cousinia rigida 
Cousinia rigidissima 
Cousinia robusta 
Cousinia rosea 
Cousinia rotundifolia 
Cousinia rubiginosa 
Cousinia rudis 
Cousinia rufidula 
Cousinia sabalanica 
Cousinia sabzevarensis 
Cousinia sagittata 
Cousinia sahandica 
Cousinia sakawensis 
Cousinia salangensis 
Cousinia saloukensis 
Cousinia sanandajensis 
Cousinia sarawschanica 
Cousinia sarzehensis 
Cousinia scabrida 
Cousinia scariosa 
Cousinia scheibeana 
Cousinia schepsaica 
Cousinia schindleriana 
Cousinia schiraziana 
Cousinia schischkinii 
Cousinia schistoptera 
Cousinia schistosa 
Cousinia schtschurowskiana 
Cousinia scleracantha
Cousinia sclerolepis 
Cousinia sclerophylla 
Cousinia sefidiana 
Cousinia seidlitzii 
Cousinia semilacera 
Cousinia serratuloides 
Cousinia sewerzowii 
Cousinia shahrestanica 
Cousinia shahvarica 
Cousinia sharifii 
Cousinia shebliensis 
Cousinia sheidaii 
Cousinia shibarensis 
Cousinia shorlughensis 
Cousinia shugnanica 
Cousinia shulabadensis 
Cousinia sicigera 
Cousinia silvanica 
Cousinia silyboides 
Cousinia simulatrix 
Cousinia singularis 
Cousinia sintenisii 
Cousinia sivasica 
Cousinia smirnowii 
Cousinia sogdiana 
Cousinia sororia 
Cousinia spathulata 
Cousinia speciosa 
Cousinia sphaerocephala 
Cousinia spiridonowii 
Cousinia splendida 
Cousinia sporadocephala 
Cousinia spryginii 
Cousinia stahliana 
Cousinia stapfiana 
Cousinia stechmanniopsis 
Cousinia stellaris 
Cousinia stenocalathia 
Cousinia stenocephala 
Cousinia stenophylla 
Cousinia stephanophora 
Cousinia stereolepis 
Cousinia stereoneura 
Cousinia stocksii 
Cousinia stricta 
Cousinia strobilocephala 
Cousinia stroterolepis 
Cousinia subappendiculata 
Cousinia subcandicans 
Cousinia subinflata 
Cousinia submutica 
Cousinia subpectinata 
Cousinia subscaposa 
Cousinia subtilis 
Cousinia sylvicola 
Cousinia syrdarjensis 
Cousinia tabrisiana 
Cousinia takharensis 
Cousinia talassica 
Cousinia tamarae 
Cousinia tashkurghanica 
Cousinia taybadensis 
Cousinia tedshenica 
Cousinia tenella 
Cousinia tenuifolia 
Cousinia tenuiramula 
Cousinia tenuisecta 
Cousinia tenuispina 
Cousinia termei 
Cousinia tetanocephala 
Cousinia thamnodes 
Cousinia thomsonii 
Cousinia tianschanica 
Cousinia tirinensis 
Cousinia trachylepis 
Cousinia trachyphylla 
Cousinia trachyphyllaria 
Cousinia tragacanthoides 
Cousinia transiliensis 
Cousinia transoxana 
Cousinia triceps 
Cousinia trichophora 
Cousinia tricolor 
Cousinia trollii 
Cousinia tscherneviae 
Cousinia turcomanica 
Cousinia turkmenorum 
Cousinia ulotoma 
Cousinia umbilicata 
Cousinia unaiensis 
Cousinia urumiensis 
Cousinia verbascifolia 
Cousinia verticillaris 
Cousinia vicaria 
Cousinia volkii 
Cousinia vvedenskyi 
Cousinia waldheimiana 
Cousinia wendelboi 
Cousinia wesheni 
Cousinia wilhelminae 
Cousinia winkleriana 
Cousinia woronowii 
Cousinia xanthacantha 
Cousinia xanthina 
Cousinia xanthiocephala 
Cousinia xanthothyrsa 
Cousinia xanthula 
Cousinia xiphiolepis 
Cousinia yasujensis 
Cousinia zagrica

References

Cynareae
Cousinia